or maté, also known as  or , is a traditional South American caffeine-rich infused herbal drink. It is made by soaking dried leaves of the yerba mate (Ilex paraguariensis) in hot water and is traditionally served with a metal straw (bombilla) in a container typically made from a calabash gourd (also called the mate), but also in some areas made from a cattle horn (guampa). A very similar preparation, mate cocido, removes some of the plant material and sometimes comes in tea bags. Today, mate is sold commercially as "yerba mate" in tea bags and as bottled iced tea.

 was consumed by the Guaraní and Tupí peoples. Its consumption was exclusive to the natives of Paraguay, more specifically the departments of Amambay and Alto Paraná. Some ethnic groups that consumed it are the Avá, the Mbyá and the Kaiowa, and also, to a lesser extent, other ethnic groups that carried out trade with them, such as the ñandevá, the Taluhet (ancient pampas) and the Qom people (Tobas). It is the national beverage of  Argentina, Paraguay and Uruguay and is also consumed in the Bolivian Chaco, Northern and Southern Chile,  southern Brazil, Syria (the largest importer in the world) and Lebanon (specially by Druze), where it was brought from Paraguay and Argentina by immigrants.

Yerba mate (Ilex paraguariensis), ka'a in the Guarani language, contains (among other compounds) the stimulant caffeine. The leaves are dried and chopped or ground to make the coarse powdery preparation called  (meaning 'herb'), which is then soaked in hot water.

Accessories 
Modern straws are typically made of nickel silver, stainless steel, or hollow-stemmed cane. The  functions both as a straw and as a sieve. The submerged end is flared, with small holes or slots that allow the brewed liquid in, but block the chunky matter that makes up much of the mixture. A modern  design uses a straight tube with holes or a spring sleeve to act as a sieve.

It is commonly made from calabash gourd but may also be made out of other materials.

History 

 was first consumed by the indigenous Guaraní who live in what is now Paraguay, southeastern Brazil, Argentina, Bolivia, Uruguay, and was also spread by the Tupí people who lived in neighbouring areas. After, it was commercialised to  part of southern Brazil and northeast Argentina, mostly some areas that were Paraguayan territory before the Paraguayan War. Therefore, the scientific name of the yerba-mate is Ilex paraguariensis. The consumption of yerba-mate became widespread with the European colonization in the Spanish colony of Paraguay in the late 16th century, among both Spanish settlers and indigenous Guaraní, who consumed it before the Spanish arrival. Yerba  consumption spread in the 17th century to the Río de la Plata and from there to Peru and Chile. This widespread consumption turned it into Paraguay's main commodity above other wares such as tobacco, cotton and beef. Aboriginal labour was used to harvest wild stands. In the mid-17th century, Jesuits managed to domesticate the plant and establish plantations in their Indian reductions in the Argentine province of Misiones, sparking severe competition with the Paraguayan harvesters of wild strands. After their expulsion in the 1770s, the Jesuit missions — along with the yerba-mate plantations — fell into ruins. The industry continued to be of prime importance for the Paraguayan economy after independence, but development in benefit of the Paraguayan state halted after the Paraguayan War (1864–1870) that devastated the country both economically and demographically.

In Brazilian and Argentine projects in late 19th and early 20th centuries, the plant was domesticated once again, opening the way for plantation systems. When Brazilian entrepreneurs turned their attention to coffee in the 1930s, Argentina, which had long been the prime consumer, took over as the largest producer, resurrecting the economy of Misiones Province, where the Jesuits had once had most of their plantations. For years, the status of largest producer shifted between Brazil and Argentina.

Today, Argentina is the largest producer with 56–62%, followed by Brazil, 34–36%, and Paraguay, 5%. Uruguay is the largest consumer per capita, consuming around 19 liters per year.

Name 
The English word comes from the French  and the American Spanish , which means both  and the vessel for drinking it, from the Quechua word  for the calabash gourd used to make it.

Both the spellings "maté" and "mate" are used in English. The acute accent indicates that the word is pronounced with two syllables, like café (both maté and café are stressed on the first syllable in the UK), rather than like the one-syllable English word "mate". An acute accent is not used in the Spanish spelling, because the first syllable is stressed. The Yerba Mate Association of the Americas points out that, in Spanish, "" with the stress on the second syllable means "I killed".

The Spanish  means "rough", "brute", or "barbarian", but is most widely understood to mean "feral", and is used in almost all of Latin America for domesticated animals that have become wild. The word was then used by the people who colonized the region of the Río de la Plata to describe the natives' rough and sour drink, drunk with no other ingredient to sweeten the taste.

Culture 

 has a strong cultural significance for both national identity and society. Yerba  is the national drink of Paraguay, where it is also consumed with either hot or ice cold water (see tereré); Argentina; and Uruguay. Drinking  is a common social practice in all of the territory of Paraguay and parts of Argentina, Brazil, Uruguay, southern Chile, and eastern Bolivia. Argentina has celebrated National Mate Day every 30 November since 2015.

 is also consumed as an iced tea in various regions of Brazil, originating both from an industrialized form, produced by Matte Leão, and from artisanal producers. It is part of the beach culture in Rio de Janeiro, where it is widely sold by beach vendors; the hot infused variation being uncommon in the area.
Due to immigrants from Syria and Lebanon, imported Mate is also consumed to a significant extent in Lebanon and especially in Syria. In term of quantity, Syria was the first importing country for several years.
 
 is a popular drink among famous footballers from South America who were seen drinking it before matches, including: Lionel Messi, Sergio Agüero, Luis Suárez, Neymar, Gonzalo Higuaín, Douglas Costa, Rodrigo Bentancur, Erik Lamela, Juan Foyth and many others; in addition, it was adopted by their European teammates who included it in their diet, such as Antoine Griezmann, Paul Pogba, Eric Dier, Danny Rose and Dele Alli.

Preparation 

The method of preparing the  infusion varies considerably from region to region, and which method yields the finest outcome is debated. However, nearly all methods have some common elements. The drink is so popular within countries that consume it, that several national electric kettle manufacturers just refer to the range 70 to 85 °C on its thermostat as "mate" temperature.

The most common preparation involves a careful arrangement of the  within the gourd before adding hot water. Too much  will result in a "short" mate; conversely, too little  results in a "long" mate, both being considered undesirable. When the gourd is adequately filled, the preparer typically grasps it with the full hand, covering and roughly sealing the opening with the palm.

The  is then shaken very gently with a side-to-side motion.

Some settling is normal, but is not desirable. The angled mound of  should remain, with its powdery peak still flat and mostly level with the top of the gourd.

All of this careful settling of the  ensures that each sip contains as little particulate matter as possible, creating a smooth-running mate. The finest particles will then be as distant as possible from the filtering end of the straw. With each draw, the smaller particles would inevitably move toward the straw, but the larger particles and stems filter much of this out. A sloped arrangement provides consistent concentration and flavor with each filling of the mate.

Such a decision is entirely a personal or cultural preference. It is important for the thumb to form a seal over the end of the straw when it is being inserted, or the air current produced in it will draw in undesirable particulates.

Brewing 

After the above process, the  may be brewed. If the straw is inserted into dry , the  must first be filled once with cool water as above, then be allowed to absorb it completely (which generally takes no more than two or three minutes). Care should be taken to maintain the dryness of the swollen top of the  beside the edge of the gourd's opening.

Etiquette 

 is traditionally drunk in a particular social setting, such as family gatherings or with friends. The same gourd (/mate) and straw are used by everyone drinking. Typically, the  fills the gourd and drinks the  completely to ensure that it is free of particulate matter and of good quality. The  possibly drinks the second filling as well, if they deem it too cold or bitter. The only exception to this order is if a new guest joins the group; in this case the new arrival receives the next mate, and then the cebador resumes the order of serving, and the new arrival will receive theirs depending on their placement in the group. When no more tea remains, the straw makes a loud sucking noise, which is not considered rude. It is impolite for anyone but the cebador to move the bombilla or otherwise mess with the mate; the cebador may take offense to this and not offer it to the offender again.

Some people also like to add lemon or orange peel, some herbs or even coffee, but these are mostly rejected by people who like to stick to the "original" mate.
Traditionally, natural gourds are used, though wood vessels, bamboo tubes, and gourd-shaped , made of ceramic or metal (stainless steel or even silver) are also common, as are vessels made from cattle horns. The gourd is traditionally made out of the porongo or  fruit shell. Gourds are commonly decorated with silver, sporting decorative or heraldic designs with floral motifs. Some gourd mates with elaborated silver ornaments and silver bombillas are true pieces of jewelry and very sought after by collectors.

Contaminants 
Research found both cold- and hot-water extractions of commercial yerba-mate products contained high levels (8.03 to 53.3 ng/g dry leaves) of carcinogenic polycyclic aromatic hydrocarbons (i.e. benzo[a]pyrene).

Other properties 

 is a rich source of caffeine. On average,  tea contains 92 mg of chlorogenic acid per gram of dry leaves, and no catechins, giving it a significantly different polyphenol profile from other teas.

However, analysis of the active chemicals in mate has found that  does not exist.

Legendary origins 

The Guaraní people started drinking  in a region that currently includes Paraguay, southern Brazil, southeastern Bolivia, northeastern Argentina and Uruguay. They have a legend that the Goddesses of the Moon and the Cloud came to visit the Earth one day. The goddesses gave him a new kind of plant, from which he could prepare a "drink of friendship" as compensation for his actions.

Variants 

Another drink can be prepared with specially cut dry leaves, very cold water, and, optionally, lemon or another fruit juice, called . It is very common in Paraguay, northeastern Argentina and in the state of Mato Grosso do Sul, Brazil. After pouring the water, it is considered proper to "wait while the saint has a sip" before the first person takes a drink. In southern Brazil,  is sometimes used as a derogatory term for a not hot enough .

In Uruguay and Brazil, the traditional gourd is usually big with a corresponding large hole. In Argentina (especially in the capital Buenos Aires), the gourd is small and has a small hole and people sometimes add sugar for flavor.

In some parts of Argentina, gas stations sponsored by  producers provide free hot water to travelers, specifically for the purpose of drinking during the journey. Disposable  sets with a plastic  and straw and sets with a thermos flask and stacking containers for the yerba and sugar inside a fitted case are available.

In Argentina,  (boiled mate), in Brazil, is made with a teabag or leaves and drunk from a cup or mug, with or without sugar and milk. Companies such as Cabrales from Mar del Plata and Establecimiento Las Marías produce teabags for export to Europe.

Travel narratives, such as Maria Graham's Journal of a Residence in Chile, show a long history of  drinking in central Chile. Many rural Chileans drink mate, in particular in the southern regions, particularly Magallanes, Aysén and Chiloé.

In Peru,  is widespread throughout the north and south, first being introduced to Lima in the 17th century. It is widespread in rural zones, and it is prepared with coca (plant) or in a sweetened tea form with small slices of lemon or orange.

In some parts of Syria, Lebanon and other Eastern Mediterranean countries, drinking  is also common. The custom came from Syrians and Lebanese who moved to South America during the late 19th and early parts of the 20th century, adopted the tradition, and kept it after returning to Western Asia. Syria is the biggest importer of yerba-mate in the world, importing 15,000 tons a year. Mostly, the Druze communities in Syria and Lebanon maintain the culture and practice of mate.

Loose  is commercially available in much of North America. Bottled  is increasingly available in the United States. Canadian bottlers have introduced a cane sugar-sweetened, carbonated variety, similar to soda pop. One brand, Sol Mate, produces  glass bottles available at Canadian and U.S. retailers, making use of the translingual pun (English 'soul mate'; Spanish/Portuguese 'sun mate') for the sake of marketing.

In some parts of the Southern Cone they prefer to drink bitter mate, especially in Paraguay, Uruguay, the south of Brazil, and parts of Argentina and Bolivia. This is referred to in Brazil and a large part of Argentina as  – which also an archaic name for wild cattle, especially, to a horse that was very attached to a cowboy—which is understood as unsweetened mate. Many people are of the opinion that  should be drunk in this form.

This form of preparation is very widespread in various regions of Argentina, like in the Santiago del Estero province, Córdoba (Argentina), Cuyo, and the metropolitan region of Buenos Aires, among others. In Chile, this form of  preparation is widespread in mostly rural zones. The spoonful of sugar or honey should fall on the edge of the cavity that the straw forms in the yerba, not all over the mate. One variation is to sweeten only the first  preparation in order to cut the bitterness of the first sip, thus softening the rest. The mixture is heated and placed in a thermos and used in place of water. Often, chamomile (in Spanish) and coconut are added to yerba in the gumpa.

In the sweet version artificial sweeteners are also often added. As an alternative sweetener, natural  (Stevia rebaudiana) is preferred, which is an herb whose leaves are added in order to give a touch of sweetness. This is used principally in Paraguay.

Materva is a sweet, carbonated soft drink based on yerba mate. Developed in Cuba in 1920, and produced since the 1960s in Miami, Florida, it is a staple of the Cuban culture in Miami.

Notes

See also 

 Black drink
 Mate con malicia (Chilean beverage)
 Ilex guayusa (caffeinated beverage made from another holly tree)
 List of Brazilian dishes
 Mate de coca
 Club-Mate
 Materva
 Guayakí
 Yaupon

References

Bibliography 
 
  Claude Lévi-Strauss (1955), Tristes Tropiques (1973 English translation by John and Doreen Weightman) New York: Atheneum

Herbal and fungal stimulants
Herbal tea
Latin American cuisine
Syrian cuisine
Tea culture
Argentine drinks
Brazilian drinks
Chilean drinks
Paraguayan drinks
Uruguayan drinks
IARC Group 2A carcinogens
Yerba mate drinks
Hot drinks
Druze culture
Indigenous cuisine of the Americas